Placilla is a Chilean town and commune in Colchagua Province, O'Higgins Region.

Demographics
Of these, 2,114 (26.2%) lived in urban areas and 5,964 (73.8%) in rural areas. The population grew by 3.6% (279 persons) between the 1992 and 2002 censuses.

Administration
As a commune, Placilla is a third-level administrative division of Chile administered by a municipal council, headed by an alcalde who is directly elected every four years. The 2012–2016 mayor was José Joaquín Latorre Muñoz (PDC); Latorre, however, died as a consequence of a car crash on 22 July 2013. Latorre had previously held the mayoral office between 1992 and 2008. He was succeeded by Tulio Contreras Álvarez, a member of the local council, who has been reelected until 2024. He died in 2022, during his third term as mayor of Placilla, and was succeeded by Marcelo González, also a Christian Democrat.

References

External links
  Municipality of Placilla

Communes of Chile
Populated places in Colchagua Province